Henning Christoph August von Anstetten is a fictional character from German soap opera Verbotene Liebe (Forbidden Love). The character was first played by Markus Hoffmann from the series premiere on January 2, 1995 to January 24, 1996. The character was recast two years later after Hoffmann committed suicide a year earlier. actor Hendirk Martz played Henning from 1998 to April 5, 2000. The role was once again recast with actor Patrik Fichte, who premiered on-screen on April 7, 2000 and played the role to the character's death on November 13, 2002.

Personality
The character found its origin in Wayne Hamilton of Sons and Daughters. Henning was shown as a snob, who wants to impress his father with his business skills. Always the feeling that Christoph favored his sister Julia over him, father and son clash many times. When Henning finds out that Julia isn't related to him, he's surprisingly very supportive of her well-being and still sees her as his sister. Henning also shows dark trails with the introduction of Tanja Wittkamp, but with time is shown as a warm and suffering hero. With the character's recasts in 1998 and 2000 the character seems more softened and became a romantic lead. Even though her schemes cost Christoph his life, Henning remains close with his longtime-stepmother Clarissa through his existence.

Storyline
Henning comes from a wealthy family and is an ambitious young man. He tries to make his father Christoph proud, but seems to fail every time, when Christoph gives him the feeling that he wasn't good enough. In the early years, Henning is jealous over his younger sister Julia, who always gets the attention from Christoph. The best relationship has he for years with his stepmother Clarissa. But he is shocked, when it's revealed that Julia isn't his sister. Clarissa brought her into her marriage with Christoph, whom she met a short time after Julia was born. Christoph knew about it all the years, still accepted Julia as his daughter and still treated his own son in a strange way. Henning and Christoph have their good and their bad times in their father-son relationship, but never found a special bound to each other.

For a short time, Henning dates the young model Carla. But he soon needs to realize that they just don't fit. When he meets Sophie Levinsky (Meike Gottschalk), a young woman and former prostitute, who helps street kids, Henning starts to getting interested in her. He breaks up with Carla and Sophie and Henning fall in love. But their love seem to be complicated from the beginning. Sophie doesn't fit in Henning's world and the couple gets broken up by one of Clarissa's schemes. After that, Henning begins an affair with the beautiful blond Tanja Wittkamp. But as beautiful as she is, Tanja is scheming person only out for her own good. When Henning ends the affair with her, he leaves town for a while.

When he comes back, Henning falls in love with the attractive artist Carolin Mohr. Happy with his professional and private life, he marries Carolin. But his wife starts a forbidden affair. It's Henning's father Christoph of all people, who she betrayals him with. When Henning finds out about the affair, he is outraged. He breaks with his father and divorces Carolin. After she left town, Carolin tells her sister Isabell on the phone that she gave birth to a son - Aaron. Henning will never find out about Aaron and it's remained unclear, if Christoph or Henning is the father. Meanwhile, Clarissa blackmails Christoph into marrying her again. Heartbroken over the feud with Henning and caught in a marriage full of hate, Christoph kills himself in his work room. Henning and Clarissa have both their problems dealing with Christoph's death.

But Henning finds new happiness in his relationship with Marie von Beyenbach, who becomes his great love. But when he asks her to marry him, their love gets destroyed by Tanja. It's put in the open that maybe not Christoph, but Marie's father Martin could be his father, since he and Henning's late mother Astrid had an affair with each other. Tanja takes the possibility and tempered the DNA test. Henning thinks that Martin is his biological father and Marie his half-sister. Shocked that their love can't be, they break up their engagement. Tanja, who claims officially that she has changed, takes her chance and wants to marry Henning herself to get his money - since that plan worked once before by Henning's uncle Ben. Tanja goes too far, when she also wants to take the chance to get her nemesis Clarissa out of the way, and wants to make it look like that she killed Henning short time after the wedding. But Henning and Clarissa already know about Tanja's plan. They let her scheme blow off. But Tanja gets her revenge when she later gets on a plane with Clarissa and the plane goes down. While Tanja shows up alive few years later, Clarissa remains dead.

After Clarissa's death, Henning decides to sell castle Friedenau with the feeling that it brought nothing but harm to his family. Still believing that Marie is his half-sister, Henning begins to fall in love with Cécile de Maron, a young French woman. Even though, Cécile feels the same for Henning, she forbids herself her feelings for him. Charlie Schneider, a longtime friend of Clarissa, becomes interested in the destiny of Henning and Cécile and wants to help them. She discovers that Cécile has a secret. The young woman suffers under multiple sclerosis. She doesn't want anyone to know and when Charlie finds out, she wants her to keep her silence. But Charlie is sure, that Henning would love Cécile anyway and Cécile just would miss her chance for her great love. When Henning finds out, he lets Cécile know how much he loves her and proposes to her. When the couple couldn't be happier, Marie's new boyfriend Mark Roloff comes behind Tanja's last scheme when he finds a letter, who proves that Henning and Marie aren't related.

Mark is scared that Marie might leave him, if she knows the truth and decides to keep quiet about the paternity lie. But with time, Mark knows that he needs to tell Marie and doesn't want to build a future with her out of lies. With the truth, it's also the beginning of the end for both couples. Even though Henning tries to be with Cécile, his desire for Marie didn't stop. Cécile realizes that Henning still loves Marie and break up with him. After they try to hide her feelings for a while, Marie and Henning reunite and Henning - once again - proposes. The happy couple gets married, but after the ceremony Mark and Henning get into a fight up on a tower. Mark can't stand the fact that Marie broke up with him and that Henning has what he wanted. The fight becomes more and more serious, when a tragic accident happens and Henning falls over the tower. Henning tells Marie one last time how much he loves her, before he dies in her arms.

Notes 

Verbotene Liebe characters
Television characters introduced in 1995
Fictional business executives
Fictional counts and countesses
Fictional socialites